Zhang Guangjun (born 21 March 1965) is a Chinese engineer and politician who is the current Vice Minister of Science and Technology, in office since November 2021. Previously he served as president of Southeast University. He is an alternate member of the 19th Central Committee of the Communist Party of China.

Biography 
Zhang was born in Tianjin, on 21 March 1965. He earned a bachelor's degree in 1986, a master's degree in 1989, and a doctor's degree in 1991, all in precision instrument and all from Tianjin University. He also studied at North Dakota State University from April 1997 to April 1998. He joined the Communist Party of China (CPC) in June 1986.

After graduating from Tianjin University, he taught at Beihang University, where he successively worked as lecturer, associate professor, professor. He moved up the ranks to become vice-president and dean of the Graduate School in December 2008. He was honored as a Distinguished Young Scholar by the National Science Fund for Distinguished Young Scholars in 2001. He was appointed as a "Chang Jiang Scholar" (or " Yangtze River Scholar") by the Ministry of Education of the People's Republic of China in 2008. In November 2015, he became president of Southeast University, a position at vice-ministerial level. In November 2021, he was appointed Vice Minister of Science and Technology by the State Council of China.

Honours and awards 
 2006 State Technological Invention Award (Second Class) for laser vision on-line dynamic measurement system and its key technology
 2008 State Technological Invention Award (First Class) for small high precision celestial body sensor technology
 2012 State Technological Invention Award (Second Class) for high precision and high dynamic vision measurement technology and system
 2013 Member of the Chinese Academy of Engineering (CAE)
 2016 State Science and Technology Progress Award (Second Class) for high dynamic star sensor technology and engineering application

References

External links 
Zhang Guangjun on the official website of the Chinese Academy of Engineering 

1965 births
Living people
Engineers from Tianjin
Tianjin University alumni
Academic staff of Beihang University
Presidents of Southeast University
Members of the Chinese Academy of Engineering
Alternate members of the 19th Central Committee of the Chinese Communist Party